Reptiloid is a 2013 Croatian short horror science-fiction film directed by Marin Mandir. It stars Mandir, Goran Kramarić and Goran Dujmić. The story revolves around police officers Petar and Darko, who are sent to investigate a murder deep in a forest on a hill, but encounter a mysterious, giant reptile there. Reptiloid won the special mention of the jury at the 2014 Kinoklub Zagreb revue of films.

Plot
The story revolves around police officers Petar and Darko, who are sent to investigate a murder deep in a forest on a hill. As they park their car, Darko goes further inside the forest on foot, in search for clues, while Petar stays at the car. However, as the support crew fails to show up, and Darko disappeared with the car key, Petar is forced to spend the night in the forest. The next morning, Petar goes to search for Darko only to find him killed by a giant, Komodo dragon like lizard. The lizard then proceeds to hunt Petar across the forest, who tries to reach the city by foot.

Cast
 Marin Mandir - Petar
 Goran Kramarić - Darko
 Goran Dujmić - Barmen
 Danijel Galić - Poker-ace

See also
 List of films featuring dinosaurs
 Croatian science fiction

References

External links

2013 films
2010s Croatian-language films
Croatian independent films
2010s science fiction horror films
2013 horror films
Films about dinosaurs
Science fiction short films
2013 short films